Freddy Krueger is a horror film character from the A Nightmare on Elm Street series.

Freddy Krueger may also refer to:
Freddy Krueger (water skier) (born 1975), world champion water skier
"Freddy Kreuger" (song), a 2004 song by Reuben
Friedrich-Wilhelm Krüger (1894–1945), Nazi official during the Third Reich

See also
 Fred Kruger (1831–1888), German-born photographer
 Frederik H. Kreuger (1928–2015), Dutch high voltage scientist and inventor